Winston James Griffiths, OBE (born 11 February 1943), known as Win Griffiths, is a former teacher  and politician, who served as a Member of the European Parliament for South Wales from 1979 to 1989 and as Member of Parliament for Bridgend from 1987 to 2005 for the Labour Party.

He held a number of front bench roles in opposition and was appointed a Parliamentary Under-Secretary in the Welsh Office by Tony Blair in May 1997, but left government after the July 1998 reshuffle. After leaving government he chaired the Welsh Grand Committee and retired from parliament in 2005.

He served as chair of Bro Morgannwg NHS Trust following his retirement  and is now Chairman of Wales Council for Voluntary Action and the Bro Morgannwg NHS Trust.

He was appointed an OBE in the 2011 New Year Honours list.

References

Offices Held 

1943 births
Living people
Welsh Labour Party MPs
UK MPs 1987–1992
UK MPs 1992–1997
UK MPs 1997–2001
UK MPs 2001–2005
Welsh socialists
Welsh Labour MEPs
MEPs for Wales 1979–1984
MEPs for Wales 1984–1989
Politics of Bridgend County Borough
Officers of the Order of the British Empire